Queensland is a community of the Halifax Regional Municipality in the Canadian province of Nova Scotia.  

The area was used by the Miꞌkmaq First Nations people.

Places of interest 

The Rug Hooking Museum of North America is to the west of the community. 

The Saint Margaret's Bay Area Rails-to-Trails follows the Nova Scotia Trunk 3 highway, part of a  multi-use recreational trail from Hubley southward to Hubbards.  It reused the route of the CN Rail line.

Parks 

Queensland has three of Nova Scotia's South Shore Region Parks in the vicinity: 

 Cleveland Beach Provincial Park (established 1978), to the north, with a sandy beach,
 Hubbards Provincial Park,  from Queensland Beach Provincial Park, with a boat launch site, and 
 Queensland Beach Provincial Park (established 1980), with a sandy beach.

Historical places 

Dorey House, 15 Dorey Lane, was recognized in 1991 as a historic place as a one-and-a-half storey, mid-nineteenth century, single-dwelling, Gothic Revival house.  Built in 1848, it was part of the Saint Margaret's Bay settlement of Foreign Protestants of Lunenburg.  Set on farming land, the owners also engaged in fishing for several generations.  It remained in the family until sold in 1984.  

The community has two cemeteries: 

 Saint Andrew's–Saint Mark's United Church Cemetery, near 8959 Saint Margaret's Bay Road, and 

 at the former Saint John the Baptist Anglican Church.

Notable persons  

 Commander 'Yogi' Jensen   RCN (ret.) Retiring from the navy in 1964, he settled in Queensland, and wrote seven books including Tin hats, oilskins and seaboots: a naval journey, 1938–1945, and illustrated another nine books. He was made a Member of the Order of Canada in 2004, for helping 'to preserve the history and heritage of Atlantic Canada'.

 Sarah Mian, Canadian writer and novelist, commencing with When the Saints (2015), resident of Queensland. 

 George Young (1924–2002), naval service, engineering and construction, writer.  Young and his family moved to Queensland in 1956.  He wrote Bluenose capers: Some  vignettes of life in Nova Scotia and other stories (1971), Bottoms up: More humorous vignettes of life in Nova Scotia and other stories (1976), Ghosts in Nova Scotia: Tales of the supernatural (1979), The short triangle: A story of the sea and men who go down to it in ships (1979), Ancient peoples and modern ghosts (1980), Over mulled rum: More  vignettes of life in Nova Scotia and other stories (1983), Who killed Surcouf: The untold story of the occupation of the Islands of Saint Pierre (1986), and Oak Island treasure.

Gallery

References 

General Service Areas in Nova Scotia
Communities in Halifax, Nova Scotia